Paralysed or paralyzed may refer to:
the state of paralysis, the complete loss of muscle function for one or more muscle groups

Music

Albums 
Paralyzed (album), a 2008 album by Witch

Songs 
"Paralyzed" (Delta Goodrem song), 2020
"Paralyzed" (Elvis Presley song), 1956
"Paralyzed" (Sueco song), 2021
"Paralyzed", by Agnes Monica from Agnes Is My Name, 2011
"Paralyzed", by Big Time Rush from Elevate, 2011
"Paralyzed", by the Cardigans from Gran Turismo, 1998
"Paralyzed", by David Archuleta from Therapy Sessions, 2020
"Paralyzed", by Failure Anthem from First World Problems, 2016
"Paralysed", by Gang of Four from Solid Gold, 1981
"Paralyzed", by Hardline from II, 2002
"Paralyzed", by Legendary Stardust Cowboy, 1968
"Paralyzed", by Marshmello from Joytime II, 2018
"Paralyzed", by NF from Mansion, 2015
"Paralysed", by Nilüfer Yanya from Miss Universe, 2019
"Paralysed", by Ride from Nowhere, 1990
"Paralyzed", by Rock Kills Kid from Are You Nervous?, 2006
"Paralyzed", by Sixpence None the Richer from Divine Discontent, 2002
"Paralysed", by Suzi Quatro from Your Mamma Won't Like Me, 1975
"Paralysed", by Travis from Everything at Once, 2016
"Paralyzed", by the Used from Lies for the Liars, 2007

See also 
"Paralyze", song by Tila Tequila, 2008
Paralysis (disambiguation)
Paralyzer (disambiguation)